Novik may refer to:
 A historical Russian term meaning a teenager from a noble, boyar, or cossack family enlisted to army or Opolchenie. This term, normally used in the 16th, 17th, and 18th centuries, may have come from the word "noviy", or "new" in Russian
 The Russian corvette Novik (1856), an 11-cannon corvette operated by the Imperial Russian Navy from 1856 to September 14, 1863
 The Russian cruiser Novik (1900), a cruiser operated by the Imperial Russian Navy from 1899 to 1904. It was later known as the Japanese cruiser Suzuya (1904)|Suzuya
 The Russian destroyer Novik (1913), a destroyer operated by the Imperial Russian Navy from 1913 to the Bolshevik Revolution. It was later known as the Yakov Sverdlov and operated by the Soviet Navy, but was sunk in 1941
 Numerous other Soviet and Russian Navy ships
 Novik, Iran
 Novik (surname)